Henrique Miranda Ribeiro (born 10 May 1993), known as Henrique Miranda, is a Brazilian footballer who plays as a left back.

Miranda made his first club appearance in the match against Figueirense for the 2011 Brazilian League.

Career statistics

Club career

Honours

Youth
São Paulo
 Copa São Paulo de Futebol Júnior: 2010

Brazil U-20
 8 Nations International Tournament: 2012

References

External links

1993 births
Living people
Brazilian footballers
Association football defenders
Campeonato Brasileiro Série A players
Campeonato Brasileiro Série B players
São Paulo FC players
Figueirense FC players
Oeste Futebol Clube players
Associação Portuguesa de Desportos players
Ekstraklasa players
Lechia Gdańsk players
Footballers at the 2011 Pan American Games
Brazilian expatriate footballers
Brazilian expatriate sportspeople in Poland
Expatriate footballers in Poland
Pan American Games competitors for Brazil
People from São Bernardo do Campo
Footballers from São Paulo (state)